Abdelhafid Boussouf Bou Chekif Airport , also known as Bou Chekif Airport, is an airport serving Tiaret, Algeria.

Airlines and destinations

See also

Transport in Algeria
List of airports in Algeria

References

External links 

SkyVector - Tiaret

Airports in Algeria
Buildings and structures in Tindouf Province